Denver Dream may refer to:
Denver Dream (football), an LFL football team based in Denver, Colorado
"Denver Dream" (song), a 1974 song by Donna Summer